The Living Corpse is a Gothic novel written by Vladimir Odoevsky in 1838 and published in 1844.

Written in the first-person, it is the story of Vasilii Kuz'mich Aristidov, who wakes up one morning to find himself a ghost. A work of social satire, it reads on a number of levels, and can be considered a vehicle for Odoevsky's own philosophical ideas.

References

1838 novels
1830s fantasy novels
Novels by Vladimir Odoevsky
Russian Gothic novels